Neocottus is a genus of ray-finned fish belonging to the family Cottidae, the typical sculpins. These fishes are endemic to endemic to Lake Baikal in Russia.

Species
There are currently two recognized species in this genus:
 Neocottus thermalis Sideleva, 2002
 Neocottus werestschagini (Taliev, 1935)

References

Abyssocottinae
Fish of Lake Baikal